Carabus lusitanicus brevis is a subspecies of beetle in the family Carabidae that is endemic to Spain. Males are yellowish-green coloured, while females are blackish-blue.

References

lusitanicus brevis
Beetles described in 1826
Endemic fauna of Spain